The Éditions Apogée is a French publishing house created in 1991 at Rennes and directed by André Crenn.

In literature, fine books, humanities, regionalism and heritage, its catalog presents three hundred and fifty titles, divided into eighteen collections ranging from poetry to men and places in Brittany, through CEDRE (Centre de recherches européennes à Rennes). 

External links 
 Official website
 Éditions Apogée on ISSUU
 SOCIETE RENNAISE EDITIONS APOGEE on société.com

Book publishing companies of France
French brands
Publishing companies established in 1991
French companies established in 1991